Potassium arsenite (KAsO2) is an inorganic compound that exists in two forms, potassium meta-arsenite (KAsO2) and potassium ortho-arsenite (K3AsO3). It is composed of arsenite ions (AsO33− or AsO2−) with arsenic always existing in the +3 oxidation state, and potassium existing in the +1 oxidation state. Like many other arsenic containing compounds, potassium arsenite is highly toxic and carcinogenic to humans. Potassium arsenite forms the basis of Fowler’s solution, which was historically used as a medicinal tonic, but due to its toxic nature its use was discontinued. Potassium arsenite is still, however, used as a rodenticide.

Structure
The two unique forms of potassium arsenite can be attributed to the different number of oxygen atoms. Potassium meta-arsenite (KAsO2) contains two oxygen atoms one of which is bonded to the arsenic atom via a double bond. Conversely, Potassium ortho-arsenite (K3AsO3) consists of three oxygen atoms all bound to the arsenic atom via single bonds. In each of these cases, arsenic exists in the +3 oxidation state and is known as arsenite, hence the single name referring to two different structures. Additionally, both the meta and ortho forms of potassium arsenite have identical properties.

Properties
Potassium arsenite is an inorganic salt that exists as an odorless white solid. It is largely soluble in water and only slightly soluble in alcohol. Solutions of potassium arsenite contain moderate concentrations of hydroxide, and are thus slightly basic. While potassium arsenite is noncombustible, heating it results in its decomposition and the formation of toxic fumes that include arsine, arsenic oxides, and potassium oxides. Potassium arsenite also reacts with acids to yield toxic arsine gas.

Preparation
Aqueous potassium arsenite, more commonly known as Fowler’s solution, can be prepared by heating arsenic trioxide (As2O3) with potassium hydroxide (KOH) in the presence of water. The  reaction is shown below
As2O3 (aq) + 2 KOH (aq) → 2 KAsO2 (aq) + H2O

Uses
In the eighteenth century English physician Thomas Fowler (1736–1801) utilized a potassium arsenite solution called Fowler’s solution to remedy a number of conditions including anemia, rheumatism, psoriasis, eczema, dermatitis, asthma, cholera, and syphilis. Furthermore, in 1865 the potential uses of potassium arsenite expanded as Fowler’s solution was used as the first chemotherapeutic agent to treat leukemia, however the chemotherapeutic effects were only temporary. Surprisingly enough, this specific use was inspired by potassium arsenite’s role in improving digestion and producing a smoother coat in horses. Potassium arsenite is also a key inorganic component of certain rodenticides, insecticides, and herbicides.  Furthermore, its role as an insecticide also made it a great wood preservative; however, the solubility and toxicity made it a potential risk factor for the environment.

Health effects
The toxicity of potassium arsenite arises from arsenic’s high affinity for sulfhydryl groups. The formation of these arsenite-sulfur bonds impairs the functionality of certain enzymes such as glutathione reductase, glutathione peroxidases, thioredoxin reductase, and thioredoxin peroxidase. These enzymes are all closely affiliated with the defense of free radicals and the metabolism of pyruvate. Thus, exposure to potassium arsenite and other arsenite containing compounds results in the production of damaging oxygen free radicals and the arrest of cellular metabolism.

Additionally, arsenite containing compounds have also been labeled carcinogens. The carcinogenicity of potassium arsenite arises from its ability to inhibit DNA repair and methylation. This impairment of the cellular machinery can lead to cancer because the cells can no longer repair or arrest mutations and a tumor results. All of these conditions exhibit the hazardous nature of potassium arsenite and other arsenite containing compounds. This is evidenced by a LD50 of 14 mg/kg for rats and a TDL of 74 mg/kg for humans.

Notes 

Arsenites
Potassium compounds